The Minority Floor Leader of the House of Representatives of the Philippines, or simply the House Minority Floor Leader, is the leader elected by the minority bloc of the House of Representatives of the Philippines that serves as their official leader in the body. He also manages the business of the minority party in the Senate. He is expected to be vigilant in the defense of the minority's rights. It is his function and duty to criticize constructively the policies and programs of the majority, and to this end employ parliamentary tactics and give close attention to all proposed legislation.

Traditionally, the defeated contender in the speakership election becomes the minority leader, but the rules were amended for the 17th Congress and now the minority bloc elects their minority leader among themselves.

List of minority floor leaders

See also 
Majority Floor Leader of the House of Representatives of the Philippines

External links
House of Representatives of the Philippines

References